Didda (1003 CE), also known as The Catherine of Kashmir was the ruler of Kashmir from  980 CE to 1003 CE. She first acted as regent for her son and various grandsons from 958 CE to 980 CE, and from 980 CE as sole ruler and monarch. Most knowledge relating to her is obtained from the Rajatarangini, a work written by Kalhana in the twelfth century.

Life 
Didda was a daughter of Simharāja, the King of Lohara, and a granddaughter on her maternal side of Bhimadeva Shahi, one of the Hindu Shahi of Kabul. Lohara lay in the Pir Panjal range of mountains, on a trade route between western Punjab and Kashmir.

At the age of 26, she married the King of Kashmir, Ksemagupta, thus uniting the Kingdom of Lohara with that of her husband. Even prior to becoming regent, Didda had considerable influence in state affairs, and coins have been found which appear to show both her name and that of Ksemagupta.

Regent 
When Ksemagupta died following a fever contracted after a hunt in 958, he was succeeded  by his son, Abhimanyu II. As Abhimanyu was still a child, Didda acted as regent and effectively exercised sole power. Compared to other societies of the period, women in Kashmir were held in high regard.

Her first task was to rid herself of troublesome ministers and nobles, whom she drove from office only to have them rebel against her. The situation was tense and she came close to losing control, but having asserted her position with support from others, including some whom she bribed, Didda displayed a ruthlessness in executing not only the rebels who had been captured but also their families. Further trouble erupted in 972, when Abhimanyu died. He was succeeded by his son, Nandigupta, still a young child himself, and this caused restlessness among the Dāmaras, who were feudatory landlords and later to cause huge problems for the Lohara dynasty which Didda founded.

In 973, she 'disposed of' Nandigupta, in Stein's phrase, and then did the same to Tribhuvanagupta, his younger brother, in 975. This left her youngest grandson, Bhimagupta, on the throne, again with Didda as regent. Her desire for absolute power became untrammeled, especially after the death of Phalunga, a counsellor who had been prime minister of her husband before being exiled by Didda after Ksemagupta's death and then brought back into her fold when his skills were required. She also took a lover called Tunga at this time, and although he was a mere herdsman, this provided her with a sense of security sufficient that in 980 she arranged for Bhimagupta to be tortured to death and assumed unfettered control for herself, with Tunga as her prime minister.

Monarch 
Didda ruled as Queen regnant from 980 CE until her death in 1003 CE, at the age of 79. She is one of the very few female monarchs in Indian history. She is sometimes called the Catherine of Kashmir, referring to the ruthless Catherine the Great of Russia, who ruled long and well with the help of her favourites, whom she periodically purged.

Although there remained some discontent among the Dāmaras, Didda and Tunga were able to resolve the issues by force and by diplomacy, causing Stein to comment that 

Vigraharaja had assumed control after he had murdered her parents. Udayaraja had to flee. She adopted a nephew, Samgrāmarāja, Udayaraja's eldest son to be her heir in Kashmir. From this decision arose the Lohara dynasty of Kashmir, although Vigraharāja even during her lifetime made attempts to assert his right to that area as well as Lohara. Her reign ended in 1003.

Mahmud of Ghazni did not raid Kashmir as far as 1013, while Didda died in 1003, ten years before Mahmud of Ghazni invaded. Didda did not embark on any adventure involving a conflict with any neighboring ruler during her rule. It was during her successor Samgrāmarāja’s rule that Mahmud of Ghazni invaded Northern India. In 1015, Ghazni's expedition to Kashmir failed, due to the inability to capture the fort of Loharkot, inclement weather and mountainous geography of the region.

In popular culture 
 Ashish Kaul's historical fiction Didda: The Warrior Queen of Kashmir  is based on Didda's life and legends.
 In January 2021, Kangana Ranaut announced that she would be making a movie Manikarnika Returns: The Legend of Didda on Queen Didda.

References 
Citations

Bibliography

 

Indian female royalty
Regents of India
10th-century women rulers
Rulers of Kashmir
11th-century women rulers
10th-century Indian women
10th-century Indian people
10th-century Indian monarchs
11th-century Indian women
11th-century Indian people
1003 deaths